Frailea castanea is a species of Frailea found in Argentina, Brazil and Uruguay.

Gallery

References

External links
 
 

castanea
Cacti of South America
Flora of Argentina
Flora of Brazil
Flora of Uruguay